Paradise is an album by jazz musician Grover Washington Jr.  Released in 1979, this was Washington's first album on Elektra Records.

Track listing
All tracks composed by Grover Washington Jr.; except where indicated.
"Paradise" (John Blake) - 7:55   	
"Icey" (Millard Vinson) - 3:48 	
"The Answer in Your Eyes" (Washington, Richard Steacker) - 8:24 	
"Asia's Theme" (James Simmons) - 5:03 	
"Shana" - 5:06 	
"Tell Me About It Now" - 5:27 	
"Feel It Comin'" (Richard Steacker) - 5:15

Personnel 
 Grover Washington Jr. – soprano saxophone, tenor saxophone, baritone saxophone, flute, arrangements (3, 5, 6, 7), electric piano (7)
 James "Sid" Simmons – acoustic piano, electric piano, arrangements (2, 4)
 Richard Lee Steacker – acoustic guitar, electric guitar, arrangements (3)
 Tyrone Brown – acoustic bass, electric bass
 Millard "Pete" Vinson – drums, Syndrums
 Leonard "Doc" Gibbs – assorted percussions
 John Blake Jr. – violin, arrangements (1)

Production 
 Grover Washington, Jr. – producer 
 Fred Galletti – engineer
 Al Alberts, Jr. – assistant engineer 
 Frank Bernardini – assistant engineer
 Mike Bonghi – assistant engineer
 Jerry Williamson – assistant engineer
 Rudy Van Gelder – mastering at Van Gelder Studios (Englewood Cliffs, NJ).
 Ron Coro – art direction
 Johnny Lee – art direction
 John Collier – illustration 
 Paul Wilson – photography

Charts

Singles

References

External links
 Grover Washington Jr. – Paradise at Discogs

1979 albums
Grover Washington Jr. albums
Elektra Records albums